White Hot Odyssey is the debut album by American hard rock band White Hot Odyssey, released on Mojo/Jive Records in 2004. The album was produced by lead singer-songwriter Steve Perry.

The song "Subway Killer" was later re-recorded in a rockabilly style as a bonus track for White Teeth, Black Thoughts, the 2013 album by Perry's other band, the Cherry Poppin' Daddies.

Track listing
All songs written and composed by Steve Perry.

"Good Head" – 3:49
"Permanent Juvenile" – 3:52
"Hot Tub Party" – 3:00
"Popularity Contest" – 3:21
"Head Cheerleader" – 2:32
"Spit It Up" – 3:11
"Subway Killer" – 3:45
"Siamese Connection" – 3:35
"Ride the Snake" – 3:43
"Lick the Pole" – 3:31
"3 in Bed" – 3:28

Credits

White Hot Odyssey
Steve Perry (Le Count d' Monet) – vocals/guitar
Jason Moss – guitar
Mark Rogers – guitar
Ed Cole – bass
Jivan Valpey – drums

Production
Produced by Steve Perry
Engineered and mixed by Bill Barnett at Gung Ho Studios in Eugene, Oregon
Mastered by Chaz Harper and Jive Records
Package design by Mark Dixon, photography by Rob Powell

References

White Hot Odyssey albums
2004 debut albums
Mojo Records albums